Entre Ríos is a small town  in the Cochabamba Department of the South American Republic of Bolivia.

Location 
Entre Ríos is the capital of the Entre Ríos Municipality, which was newly established in 2004, the sixth municipal section of Carrasco Province.

Geography 
Entre Ríos is situated in the Bolivian lowlands on the north-eastern foothills of the Cordillera Oriental. The region has an average temperature of 24 °C, the monthly averages range from 26 °C (October to December) to 20 °C (June and July).

Regional traffic 
Entre Ríos is located 265 km east of Cochabamba, the department's capital. 
From Cochabamba to Entre Ríos the road passes Villa Tunari, Chimoré and Ivirgarzama, east of Entre Ríos the road leads to Warnes und Santa Cruz de la Sierra.

Population 
The population of the place has increased rapidly over the past two decades:
1992: 1,952 inhabitants (census)
2001: 3,796 inhabitants (census)
2010: 5,080 inhabitants (updating)

Due to the historically developed population distribution, the region is predominantly inhabited by Quechuas, 76.6 percent of the population in the Entre Ríos Municipality speak the Quechua language.

References

External links 
 Map of Carrasco Province

Populated places in Cochabamba Department